Nagai Station (長居駅, Nagai eki) is a railway station in Sumiyoshi-ku, Osaka, Japan. The station is served by the Hanwa Line of West Japan Railway Company (JR West) and the Midōsuji Line of Osaka Metro; the former uses elevated tracks and the latter uses underground tracks. The subway station is assigned the station number M26. Nagai is located south of Tennoji in Sumiyoshi-ku and maintains Nagai Park and Nagai Stadium, an international standard football stadium home to the J-League team Cerezo Osaka.

Layout

JR West Hanwa Line

This station is administrated by Sakaishi Station. When it was located on the ground level, Nagai Station had two island platforms serving 2 tracks each. The station is currently elevated (northbound in 2004, southbound in 2006) and has two side platforms serving a track each. Ticket gate is located in the north under the platforms and tracks.

Osaka Metro Midosuji Line

The station has two side platforms serving two tracks on the second basement. Ticket gates are located in the north and the south on the first basement.

Surroundings

Nagai Park
Nagai Stadium
Nagai Ball Gall Field (Kincho Stadium)
Nagai Aid Stadium
Nagai Pool
Nagai Youth Hostel
Nagai Botanical Garden
Osaka Museum of Natural History
Rinnan-ji

Schools
Osaka Gakugei Senior High School
Osaka Gakugei Secondary School
Osaka Municipal Nagai Elementary School
Osaka Municipal Abiko Junior High School

Shopping and finance
Supermarket Life Nagai
Kansai Super Nagai
Nagai Hondori Shotengai
The Kinki Osaka Bank Nagai Branch
The Senshu-Ikeda Bank Nagai Branch
The Juso Shinkin Bank Nagai Branch
Japan Post Group
Sumiyoshi Nagai Post Office
Sumiyoshi Nagai-4 Post Office
Sumiyoshi Nagai-higashi Post Office

Buses
Subway Nagai (Osaka Municipal Transportation Bureau)
Route 4 for  / for 
Route 24 for Sumiyoshi Shako-mae / for Minami-Nagai
Route 40 for Sumiyoshi Shako-mae / for Deto Bus Terminal
Nagainishi Nichome (Osaka Municipal Transportation Bureau)
Route 24 for Sumiyoshi Shako-mae / for Minami-Nagai
Route 40 for Sumiyoshi Shako-mae / for Deto Bus Terminal

History
18 July 1929 -  on Hanwa Electric Railway opened.
1 December 1940 - Hanwa Electric Railway became the Yamanote Line of Nankai Railway.
1 May 1944 - Yamanote Line was nationalized and became the Hanwa Line.  Rinnanji-mae Station was renamed Nagai Station.
1 July 1960- Nagai Station on the Osaka Municipal Subway Midōsuji Line opened.
16 October 2004- Hanwa Line northbound station was elevated.
21 May 2006 - Hanwa Line southbound station was elevated.
March 2018 - March 2018 - Station numbering was introduced to the Hanwa Line with Nagai being assigned station number JR-R24.

References

External links
Sumiyoshi-ku website in English
Station guide  - Osaka Metro

Railway stations in Japan opened in 1960
Railway stations in Japan opened in 1929
Osaka Metro stations
Railway stations in Osaka Prefecture